FCW (launched as Federal Computer Week) is a news website that covers U.S. federal government technology and occasionally state, local, tribal and international governments. It is owned by GovExec.

FCW was established in 1987 by International Data Group as a weekly print magazine headquartered in Vienna, Virginia. By 2003, it was part of FCW Media Group. 

Its ownership passed to California-based 1105 Government Information Group, a privately held company backed by two private equity firms: Nautic Partners  and Alta Communications. Editor Christopher Dorobek resigned in August 2008 to accept a position at WFED. In December 2008, David Rapp, formerly an executive with Congressional Quarterly, became the publication's new editor (and editorial director overseeing all 1105 GovInfo publications). 

In 2021, 1105 sold FCW and several sister publications to GovExec.

References

External links 
 
 1105 Government Info

1987 establishments in Virginia
Computer magazines published in the United States
Weekly magazines published in the United States
Magazines established in 1987
Magazines published in Virginia